Terence Edward Armstrong (7 April 1920 – 21 February 1996) was a British polar geographer, sea ice specialist, writer,  and expert on the Russian Arctic.

Career
Terence Edward Armstrong was educated at Twyford School, Winchester College, and from 1938 took a first class honours in French and Russian languages at Magdalene College, Cambridge, graduating in 1940. During the Second World War he served in the Army Intelligence Corps and the First Airborne Division in North Africa, Italy and Holland, being wounded as a parachutist at Arnhem, and Oslo where he led a contingent of soldiers. Following the War he returned to Cambridge where he became the first fellow in Soviet Arctic Studies between 1947 and 1956 at the Scott Polar Research Institute (SPRI), a position especially created for him. He was the SPRI Assistant Director of Research 1956–77, its Acting Director 1982–83, and the Reader in Arctic Studies 1977–83. He was a founding fellow and tutor of Clare Hall between 1964 and 1996 and was Clare's Vice-President from 1985 to 1987.

From the early 1950s Armstrong, who was fluent in Russian and under Anglo-Soviet Cultural Agreement exchange visits, pursued fieldwork within the Arctic Circle to the north of Russia, studying indigenous population demographics and education, settlement and regional economics, while interpreting Soviet publications, later writing the historical study Russian Settlement in the North (1965). This work led to a study of sea ice in the Northeast Passage, and its impact on Soviet shipping. For the Royal Navy Scientific Survey he sailed with the Canadian icebreaker HMCS Labrador on its 1954 maiden voyage through the Northwest Passage. For the SPRI Polar Record journal he provided yearly summaries of Soviet shipping movement. Armstrong's work  was appreciated and trusted within the Soviet Union, this demonstrated when he was invited to Moscow to give the funeral oration for his Russian friend and fellow geographer Boris Kremer. Armstrong's body of study for Arctic Russia at the SPRI library has become a resource for visiting Russian scholars. His work became important with scholars and researchers to a broader Arctic study, particularly geographers George Rogers, the Canadian-based Graham Rowley, and the Alaskans Vic Fischer and Frank Darnell. In 1976 he and Darnell became founder members of a cross-cultural international education committee. Armstrong in 1978 published Circumpolar North with Graham Rowley and George Rogers. Armstrong retired in 1983, after which he became a Trent University, Ontario visiting professor, and was the Natural Environment Research Council's chairman.

Armstrong Reef in Antarctica was named by the UK Antarctic Place-Names Committee after Terence Edward Armstrong.

Personal life
Armstrong was born at Oxted, Surrey, on 7 April 1920, and died at Harston in Cambridgeshire on 21 February 1996, where he had lived for 40 years at Harston House. He married Iris Forbes in 1943; they produced four children.

Honorary awards
Armstrong in 1963 received an honorary LLD from Montreal's McGill University, in 1980 an honorary DSc from the University of Alaska—where in 1970–72 he held a sabbatical—and in 1978 the Victoria Medal, and the Cuthbert Peek Award (1963), from the Royal Geographical Society in which he was a fellow. He was also a fellow of the Arctic Institute of North America. He was from 1965 to 1990 the Honorary Secretary of The Hakluyt Society, for which he managed the publication of 50 volumes of documents and papers. Armstrong was the International Glaciological Society's Honorary Treasurer between 1963 and 1970.

Publications
Sea ice north of the USSR, atlas, British Admiralty (1958)
Russian settlement in the North (1965) Cambridge University Press; Reissue edition (2010). 
Illustrated glossary of snow and ice (1966), with Brian Roberts and Charles Swithinbank, Scott Polar Research Institute
Yermak's Campaign in Siberia: A selection of documents translated from the Russian by Tatiana Minorsky and David Wileman Hakluyt Society (1974), 
Circumpolar North: Political and Economic Geography of the Arctic and Sub-Arctic, Methuen (1978). 
The Northern Sea Route: Soviet Exploitation of the North East Passage, Cambridge University Press (2011), "the seminal work in English on the history of the Northern Sea Route from the 16th century to 1949"
The Russians in the Arctic: Aspects of Soviet exploration and exploitation of the Far North, 1937-57, Methuen (1958); reprint Nabu Press (2014),

Further reading
Heap, John, "Terence Edward Armstrong", Polar Record, Volume 32, issue 182, July 1996, pp. 265–270, Cambridge University Press (1996)
"Terence Edward Armstrong", (Archives Hub), Terence Armstrong Collection, Scott Polar Research Institute, University of Cambridge
"Terence Armstrong", Oxford Dictionary of National Biography

References

1920 births
1996 deaths
People educated at Twyford School
Alumni of Magdalene College, Cambridge
People educated at Winchester College
People from Oxted
English cartographers
English geographers
20th-century English people
20th-century cartographers
Academics of the University of Cambridge
Fellows of Clare College, Cambridge
People from Harston
People of the Scott Polar Research Institute
Victoria Medal recipients